Laura Mason Brotherson is the author of the best-selling book about sexual intimacy and marital oneness titled And They Were Not Ashamed: Strengthening Marriage through Sexual Fulfillment (373 pages, published May 2004). She is a marriage and intimacy educator who speaks and writes on subjects related to marriage, sex and intimacy. As an intimacy expert and relationship consultant, Brotherson is the host of The Marital Intimacy Show (a weekly online program) on The Women's Information Network (The WIN).

Biography 

Laura Brotherson was raised in Cardston, Alberta; Rigby, Idaho; and Tacoma, Washington.  Brotherson received her bachelor's degree in Family Sciences from Brigham Young University, and is completing her master's in Marriage and Family Therapy (MFT) at Capella University.

She and her husband Kevin Brotherson were married in 1991 in the Seattle Washington Temple. In the Church of Jesus Christ of Latter-day Saints (LDS Church), she has served as a Relief Society president, Young Women's president, and in various teaching-related callings. Although born in Canada, she is now an American citizen.

She has contributed articles to such publications as Meridian Magazine, MormonTimes.com and Hitched magazine. She also runs a website, StrengtheningMarriage.com.

Sources 

 author bio from a Meridian Magazine article
 Author bio from a Mormon Times article
 bio from her website

Year of birth missing (living people)
Living people
Family therapists
American relationships and sexuality writers
American Latter Day Saint writers
Brigham Young University alumni
People from Cardston
Writers from Tacoma, Washington
Latter Day Saints from Idaho
Latter Day Saints from Washington (state)
Canadian Latter Day Saints
Canadian emigrants to the United States
American women non-fiction writers